Soltan Teymur oglu Mammadov (born 1 April 1974) is an Azerbaijani politician who is a Member of the National Assembly of Azerbaijan (VI convocation).

Life 
Soltan Mammadov was born on April 1, 1974, in Baku. Graduated from the Faculty of Automation of Production Processes of the Azerbaijan State Oil and Industry University and the Faculty of Public Health Management of the Khazar University, he has a Ph.D. at technical sciences. He was awarded the “Taraggi” medal.

Political activity 
He is non-partisan. He is a member of the Labor and Social Policy Committee and the Committee on Healthcare of the Milli Mejlis. Head of the working group for the Azerbaijani-French inter-parliamentary relations, member of the working groups for the inter-parliamentary relation of Azerbaijan with the Federal Republic of Germany, United Arab Emirates, Bosnia and Herzegovina, Czech Republic, China, Georgia, Switzerland, Italy, Colombia and Japan. He is a substitute member of the Azerbaijani delegation to the Euronest Parliamentary Assembly.

References 

1974 births
Politicians from Baku
Azerbaijan International University alumni
Azerbaijan State Oil and Industry University alumni
Khazar University alumni
Members of the National Assembly (Azerbaijan)
Living people